Libycochoerus is an extinct genus of large and long-legged animals in the pig family from the Miocene of Africa.

Taxonomy
Libycochoerus was at one point sunk as a junior synonym of Kubanochoerus but is now considered a distinct genus. All species of this species have very robust teeth that are mesiodistally long, but also stout canines and simple molars.

References

 

Prehistoric Suidae
Miocene mammals of Africa
Miocene even-toed ungulates
Fossil taxa described in 1961
Prehistoric even-toed ungulate genera